European Executive was a British airline based in Shoreham, United Kingdom. It operated scheduled passenger flights and corporate, pleasure and freight flights. Its main base was Shoreham (Brighton City) Airport.

Services

European Executive operated charter flights throughout Europe. It then evolved to a scheduled airline, most commonly to Rouen, Guernsey, Le Touquet and Jersey. It was managed by one Dave Chowen, an ex British Airways captain.

External links
European Executive

Airlines of the United Kingdom